Herbert Reginald Vyvyan  (1867–1949) was a British soldier, police officer and Chief Constable.

Early life 

Vyvyan was born in 1862 in Hastings, Sussex, to Reverend Herbert Francis Vyvyan and Augusta Clara de Schmiedern and spent his childhood in Withiel, Cornwall. He was schooled at Cheltenham College, and after a short period in Germany returned to England and continued his education at Brackenbury, and Wynne College in Wimbledon. On 6 January 1889 he married Caroline Jane Hunt in Lahore, presidency of Bengal, and with her had a son and a daughter.

Military career 

On leaving college Vyvyan was gazetted with the Cornish Rangers, billeted in Bodmin, a unit which in July 1881 became the 3rd Duke of Cornwall's Light Infantry. Before the outbreak of the First Boer War he resigned his commission, but re-enlisted in 1885 with the Devonshire Regiment, taking the rank of captain. During the Second Boer War he was adjutant to the 1st Rifle Volunteers, and in 1902 at war's end he was appointed part of the Reparation Commission which oversaw the re-establishment of the Boers on their farms, and for also dealing with claims. Vyvyan retired from the military in 1903 and moved to Exeter. Whilst in military service he established himself as a keen sportsman, playing golf and cricket for his regiment.

Devon Constabulary 

On retirement from the Army in 1903, Vyvyan was appointed Superintendent of the Devon Constabulary, Cullompton Division, a post he held until 1907. Upon the retirement of Chief Constable F. R. C. Coleridge in that year, Vyvyan was promoted to Chief Constable.

In 1928, for services to the police, he was appointed an OBE.

He retired from the police on 1 April 1931 and was succeeded by Lyndon Henry Morris.

Later activities & death 

In 1938 Vyvyan married Emmeline Mabel Carlyon, the widow of Lieutenant-Colonel A. F.  Carlyon R.A.M.C. The ceremony was held at the British Consulate in Alexandria, Egypt and she was his 2nd wife.

Vyvyan died in a care home in Worthing, aged 87. He was the heir presumptive to his kinsman, Sir Richard Philip Vyvyan, 11th Baronet.

References

1862 births
1949 deaths
British Chief Constables
Officers of the Order of the British Empire
Duke of Cornwall's Light Infantry officers
Devonshire Regiment officers
British Army personnel of the Second Boer War